Phyllonorycter deceptusella is a moth in the family Gracillariidae. It is known Kentucky and Maine in the United States.

The wingspan is about 6 mm.

The larvae feed on Crataegus species. They mine the leaves of their host plant.

References

deceptusella
Moths of North America
Moths described in 1879